Côte Saint-Luc–Hampstead–Montreal West was a borough in the western part of Montreal, Quebec. It was composed of the former municipalities of Côte Saint-Luc, Hampstead, and Montreal West.

On January 1, 2002, all three municipalities were merged by the provincial government. On June 20, 2004, all three municipalities voted to return to being independent municipalities, effective January 1, 2006, dissolving the borough.

See also
 List of former boroughs
 Montreal Merger
 Municipal reorganization in Quebec

Former Montreal boroughs
2002 establishments in Quebec
2006 disestablishments in Quebec
Côte Saint-Luc
Montreal West, Quebec
Hampstead, Quebec